Wäks is an Electroclash and Punk rock group from Annecy in France, and Geneva in Switzerland. The group is led by vocalist and programmer Soph' who formed the group in 2003 with current members Dav (guitars) Duckk (machines) and with Theo who was the bassist of the group until 2009.

Today, the group is formed by Soph', Dav, Duckk and Ben the drummer (who joined the group in 2009). The group is well known for their cartoon logos and their energetic live shows, which often include live visuals and many laser lights.

The group released their first album, Elektro Sucks in 2006, it was very well received by the French independent press, and it earned them a big fanbase from supporting other French industrial/electro acts in France. Their second album called Wäkshing Machine was released in 2008.

Their tour locations include many locations in France and Switzerland but they have also played in Germany, Czech Republic, Austria, Belgium, Luxembourg and Hungary.

Discography
Elektro Sucks 2006; Urgence Disc Recordings
Wäkshing Machine 2008; Urgence Disc Recordings

External links
Official myspace

Musical groups from Auvergne-Rhône-Alpes
French punk rock groups